Joseph Aloysius Kennedy (January 12, 1947) is a retired American professional basketball player who competed in the National Basketball Association (NBA) for two seasons and the American Basketball Association (ABA) for one season. He played college basketball at Duke, and played professionally for the Seattle SuperSonics of the NBA, and finally the Pittsburgh Condors of the ABA.

References

1947 births
Living people
American men's basketball players
DeMatha Catholic High School alumni
Duke Blue Devils men's basketball players
Pittsburgh Condors players
Portland Trail Blazers expansion draft picks
Seattle SuperSonics draft picks
Seattle SuperSonics players
Small forwards